Alexei Potapov (born March 2, 1989) is a Russian professional ice hockey player. He is currently playing with HC Dynamo Moscow of the Kontinental Hockey League (KHL).

Playing career
Potapov made his Kontinental Hockey League debut playing with Torpedo Nizhny Novgorod during the inaugural 2008–09 KHL season.

During his 11th season with Torpedo Nizhny in 2017–18, and going scoreless in 18 contests, Potapov as the longest tenured player was traded by Torpedo to Ak Bars Kazan on November 20, 2017. He added four goals in 24 regular season contests before helping Ak Bars to their third Gagarin Cup title in the post-season.

As a free agent from Ak Bars, Potapov continued his KHL career in agreeing to a two-year contract with Avangard Omsk on 2 May 2019.

After helping Avangard capture the Gagarin Cup in the 2020–21 season, Potapov left as a free agent and was signed to a two-year contract with Traktor Chelyabinsk on 7 May 2021.

Awards and honours

References

External links

1989 births
Living people
Ak Bars Kazan players
Avangard Omsk players
HC Dynamo Moscow players
Torpedo Nizhny Novgorod players
Traktor Chelyabinsk players
Russian ice hockey forwards
Sportspeople from Nizhny Novgorod